HMAS Leeuwin (HS 01/A 245) is the lead ship of the Leeuwin-class of hydrographic survey vessels operated by the Royal Australian Navy (RAN).

Design and construction

Leeuwin has a displacement of 2,170 tons at full load. Main propulsion machinery consists of four GEC Alsthom 6RK 215 diesel generators, which supply two Alsthom electric motors, each driving a propeller shaft. A Schottel bow thruster is fitted for additional manoeuvrability.

The sensor suite consists of a STN Atlas 9600 APRA I-band navigational radar, a C-Tech CMAS 36/39 hull-mounted sonar, an Atlas Fansweep-20 multibeam echo sounder, an Atlas Hydrographic Deso single-beam echo sounder, and a Klein 2000 towed sonar. There are three sets of davits fitted to carry Fantome-class survey boats. The ship is fitted with a helicopter deck for an AS 350B Squirrel helicopter (detached from 723 Squadron), although there are no long-term hosting facilities. She is armed with two single 12.7 mm machine guns. The ship's company consists of 10 officers and 46 sailors, plus up to 5 trainees. The Leeuwin class were the first RAN ships to use a multi-crewing concept, with three complements used to operate the two vessels.

Leeuwin was ordered from NQEA Australia on 2 April 1996, and built at the company's shipyard in Cairns. She was laid down on 9 May 1997 and launched on 23 June 1998. Leeuwin and sister ship Melville underwent a joint commissioning ceremony on 27 May 2000. Leeuwin initially carried the pennant number "HS 01", but this was changed to "A 245" in 2004. She is named after Cape Leeuwin, the south-west-most point of the Australian continent.

Operational history
In late 2001, Leeuwin began to operate in support of border protection operations in addition to her normal hydrographic duties. In January 2002, Leeuwin was repainted from white to grey.

In October 2013, Leeuwin participated in the International Fleet Review 2013 in Sydney. The fleet was reviewed by Governor-General Quentin Bryce on 5 October from Leeuwins helicopter deck, with Bryce accompanied by Prince Harry.

Leeuwin sailed to Fiji in July 2015 for a seabed-mapping operation around Rotuma Island. This was the first RAN deployment to the region in eight years, since the deterioration of ties between the nations after the 2006 Fijian coup d'état.

Citations

References

 
 
 

Naval ships of Australia
Leeuwin-class survey vessels
Survey ships of the Royal Australian Navy
1997 ships